Local elections are held every three years ending on the second Saturday in October in New Zealand to elect local government politicians using postal voting.

Background

Elections for the city, district and regional councils of New Zealand have a fixed election date, unlike general elections. Under section 10 of the Local Electoral Act 2001, elections must be held on the "second Saturday in October in every third year" from the date the Act came into effect in 2001. The last local body elections were held on 12 October 2019. The next will be held on 8 October 2022. Local elections are mostly organised by district and city councils, with other organisations (for example the Electoral Commission, the Department of Internal Affairs, and the Ministry of Health) having peripheral roles. The elections determine the membership of district, city, and regional councils, as well as the elected parts of district health boards. In some places, licensing trusts and local boards are also voted for. Elections are held by postal voting.

Under New Zealand law, those who are eligible to enrol (18 year of age, lived in New Zealand continuously for at least one year at some time, and are either a New Zealand citizen or a permanent resident) must do so. People can vote in the area where they live, and it is up to voters to decide which address they consider their home (e.g. a student may choose to enrol where they live during term time, or their parents' place if they go home during the holidays). If a person owns property in which they do not live, they can also apply to be put onto the ratepayer roll for local elections. That is, an individual may be eligible to vote in more than one voting area for local elections.

Mayoral elections

Auckland City

Christchurch

Dunedin

Hamilton
1976 Hamilton mayoral by-election
2013 Hamilton mayoral election
2016 Hamilton mayoral election
2019 Hamilton mayoral election
2022 Hamilton mayoral election

Invercargill

Lower Hutt

Nelson
2016 Nelson mayoral election
2019 Nelson mayoral election

Napier
1917 Napier mayoral election

Porirua
2016 Porirua mayoral election
2019 Porirua mayoral election
2022 Porirua mayoral election

Rangitikei
2010 Rangitikei mayoral election
2013 Rangitikei mayoral election
2016 Rangitikei mayoral election

Rotorua
2019 Rotorua mayoral election
2022 Rotorua mayoral election

Tauranga
2016 Tauranga mayoral election
2019 Tauranga mayoral election

Upper Hutt
2016 Upper Hutt mayoral election
2019 Upper Hutt mayoral election
2022 Upper Hutt mayoral election

Wellington

Local elections by region

Northland

Auckland
2010 Auckland local elections
2010 Auckland local board elections
2013 Auckland local elections
2013 Auckland local board elections
2016 Auckland local elections
2016 Auckland local board elections
2019 Auckland local elections
2019 Auckland local board elections
2022 Auckland local elections
2022 Auckland local board elections

Waikato

Hamilton
2013 Hamilton local elections and referendums

Bay of Plenty
2019 Bay of Plenty local elections

Gisborne

Hawke's Bay

Taranaki

Manawatū-Whanganui

Rangitikei
2010 Rangitikei local elections
2013 Rangitikei local elections
2016 Rangitikei local elections

Wellington
1986 Wellington local elections
1989 Wellington local elections
1992 Wellington local elections
1995 Wellington local elections
1998 Wellington local elections
2001 Wellington local elections
2004 Wellington local elections
2007 Wellington local elections
2010 Wellington local elections
2013 Wellington local elections
2016 Wellington local elections
2019 Wellington local elections
2022 Wellington local elections

Tasman

Nelson

Marlborough

West Coast

Canterbury
2016 Canterbury local elections

Christchurch
2022 Christchurch local elections

Otago
2022 Otago Regional Council election

Dunedin
2010 Dunedin local elections
2022 Dunedin local elections

Southland

See also
Politics of New Zealand
Local government in New Zealand

References

External links
Local Government New Zealand